Henriettea is a genus of flowering plants in the family Melastomataceae, with some 399 species accepted. It is distributed in the Americas. Some species in the genus are known commonly as camasey., though the common name camasey may also refer to plants of genus Miconia.

Species accepted as of March 2021 are:

Henriettea acunae 
Henriettea aggregata 
Henriettea angustifolia 
Henriettea barkeri 
Henriettea boliviensis 
Henriettea bracteosa 
Henriettea caudata 
Henriettea ciliata 
Henriettea cuabae 
Henriettea cuneata 
Henriettea duckeana 
Henriettea ekmanii 
Henriettea fascicularis 
Henriettea fissanthera 
Henriettea flavescens 
Henriettea gibberosa 
Henriettea glabra 
Henriettea gomesii 
Henriettea goudotiana 
Henriettea granulata 
Henriettea heteroneura 
Henriettea hondurensis 
Henriettea horridula 
Henriettea hotteana 
Henriettea ininiensis 
Henriettea lasiostylis 
Henriettea lateriflora 
Henriettea lawrancei 
Henriettea loretensis 
Henriettea lundellii 
Henriettea macfadyenii 
Henriettea maguirei 
Henriettea manarae 
Henriettea maroniensis 
Henriettea martiusii 
Henriettea megaloclada 
Henriettea membranifolia 
Henriettea mucronata 
Henriettea multiflora 
Henriettea multigemma 
Henriettea odorata 
Henriettea ovata 
Henriettea patrisiana 
Henriettea prancei 
Henriettea punctata 
Henriettea ramiflora 
Henriettea reflexa 
Henriettea rimosa 
Henriettea saldanhaei 
Henriettea seemannii 
Henriettea sessilifolia 
Henriettea sierrae 
Henriettea spruceana 
Henriettea squamata 
Henriettea squamulosa 
Henriettea stellaris 
Henriettea steyermarkii 
Henriettea strigosa 
Henriettea succosa 
Henriettea tachirensis 
Henriettea tobagensis 
Henriettea tovarensis 
Henriettea trachyphylla 
Henriettea triflora 
Henriettea tuberculosa 
Henriettea uniflora 
Henriettea verrucosa 
Henriettea williamsii

References

 
Melastomataceae genera
Taxonomy articles created by Polbot